Mizab (also Romanized as Mīzāb) is a village in Harzandat-e Sharqi Rural District, in the Central District of Marand County, East Azerbaijan Province, Iran. At the 2011 census, its population was 231, in 75 families.

References 

Populated places in Marand County